WOKN (99.5 FM) is a radio station broadcasting a country music format. Licensed to Southport, New York, United States, the station serves the Elmira-Corning area. The station is currently owned by Tower Broadcasting LLC and features programming from Westwood One.

FM Translator
WOKN also simulcasts from an FM translator in Corning, New York.

References

External links

OKN
Country radio stations in the United States
Waypoint Media